Dubble Bubble is an American brand of fruit-flavoured, usually pink-colored, bubble gum invented by Walter Diemer, an accountant at Philadelphia-based Fleer Chewing Gum Company in 1928. One of Diemer’s hobbies was concocting recipes for chewing gum based on the original Fleer ingredients. Though founder Frank H. Fleer had come up with his own bubble gum recipe under the name Blibber-Blubber in 1906, it was shelved due to its being too sticky and breaking apart too easily. It would be another 20 years until Diemer would use the original idea as inspiration for his invention.

History

Fleer Chewing Gum Company, in Philadelphia, had been searching for years to produce a formula that allowed bubbles to be blown that did not stick. In 1928, while Walter Diemer was testing new gum recipes, he noticed that his product was less sticky than regular chewing gum, and after testing it he found that he could create bubbles easily. After a year of attempts, he made the first successful batch of bubble gum. But the next morning when trying to recreate his successful concoction, he failed to reproduce the same results. After four months of trying to mimic his first success, he finally made a 300-pound batch of what would become Dubble Bubble. The only food coloring available at the factory was pink, so Diemer had no choice but to use it, and the color would go on to become the standard for gum for the world over. Using a salt water taffy wrapping machine, Diemer decided to individually wrap 100 pieces and brought the stock to a local candy store. The gum was priced at one penny apiece and sold out in one day. Before long, the Fleer Chewing Gum Company began making bubble gum using Diemer’s recipe, and the gum was marketed as “Dubble Bubble” gum. Diemer’s bubble gum was the first-ever commercially sold bubble gum, and its sales surpassed 1.5 million dollars in the first year. To help sell the new bubble gum, Diemer himself taught salespeople how to blow bubbles so that they in turn could teach potential customers.

The original gum featured a color comic strip, known as the Fleer Funnies, which was included with the gum. The featured characters, ‘Dub and Bub’, were introduced in 1930 but were replaced by the iconic Pud and his pals in 1950. Originally, Pud was much more rotund than the slimmed down version seen in the 1960s. The early comics were especially large and colorful. The comic also included Fleer Fortunes and Dubble Bubble Facts. The comics were sequentially numbered which made collecting them easy. They are not dated though, so it is difficult to know the exact year of release. By the late 1950s and early 1960s, Fleer Funnies shrank to the small size most people remember. More than 1,002 comics have been released over the years. During World War II, Dubble Bubble was distributed to the military. Sugar and latex became scarce due to the war and bubble gum manufacturing was halted in 1942. In 1951, Fleer resumed manufacturing of Dubble Bubble and the popularity of its gum grew steadily. Over time, Fleer extended its reach by adding new flavors and new formats like ball gum and expanded distribution of its products overseas. In 1957, Fleer introduced the first gum 6-pack with Dubble Bubble. In 1998, Dubble Bubble was purchased by Concord Confections and in 1999 they introduced Dubble Bubble as a gumball. In 2003, Tootsie Roll Industries acquired Concord. Since Concord's acquisition, Dubble Bubble has since used a different recipe and also discontinued the comic strips and fortunes on the wrappers, but continued to use Pud as its mascot.

Ingredients
The main ingredients in Dubble Bubble gum are Sugar, Dextrose, Corn Syrup, Gum Base, Tapioca Dextrin, Titanium Dioxide, Confectioner's Glaze, Carnauba Wax, Corn Starch, Artificial Flavors, Artificial Colors, (FD&C Red 40, Blue 1, Yellow 5, Yellow 6, Red 3), and BHT (to maintain freshness).

The ingredients of "1928 Original" Dubble Bubble gum are Sugar, Dextrose, Corn Syrup, Gum Base, Artificial Flavor, Colour, Corn Starch and BHT.

Dubble Bubble gum products are nut-free, gluten-free, peanut-free and kosher.

Dubble Bubble twist gummies  is a  6 g, bite-size piece of chewing gum containing 20 calories with 0 g of fat, 0 mg of cholesterol, 5 mg of sodium, 5 g of carbohydrates, 0 g of dietary fiber, 4 g of sugar and 0 g of protein. Dubble Bubble Ball Gum is available in 5 g servings containing 20 calories, 5 mg of sodium, 5 g of carbs and 4 g of sugars. Dubble Bubble specialty bubble-gum cigars come in 20 g servings and contain 70 calories, 18 g of carbs and 15 g of sugar. Dubble Bubble Office Pleasures bite-size gum pieces come in 3.5 g servings containing 15 calories, 3 g of carbs and 3 g of sugar.

See also
 List of confectionery brands

References

External links

Brand name confectionery
Chewing gum
Tootsie Roll Industries brands
Products introduced in 1928